Ole Hamre (born 20 October 1959) is a Norwegian drummer. He has worked with Bugge Wesseltoft, Kari Bremnes, Ole Paus, Ketil Bjørnstad, Frode Alnæs, Silje Nergaard, Arve Henriksen and Knut Reiersrud.

Career
Hamre is known for his collaboration with accordionist Gabriel Fliflet, including the duo Fliflet/Hamre (1991–) and the music group Fri Fri Flyt (1993–2001). As a composer, he has written a number of commissioned works, music for film and television, vignettes, and the like. He has since 2006 organized OiOi-festivalen, an outdoor program under Festspillene i Bergen. OiOi stands for Experience, empathy, attention and insight, and the motto "Distinctive and popular" is the festival's main goal is to get more people to feel like a natural part of the Bergen International Festival.

Hamre is the initiator and artistic director of the multi-ethnic children and youth project Fargespill. The project has since 2005 produced the performances "Fargespill", "Fargelys" and "Flere farger". A total of 70 children and adolescents from 20 countries, all residents of Bergen, are actors on stage and the performances have had over 25,000 visitors. The show is composed of music and dances that the participants bring with them from their homeland, combined with the Norwegian folk music and dance, mixed with elements of modern global youth culture.

Hamre is also the man behind the human organ Folkofonen, an audiovisual instrument for communicating art consisting of video and sound of people singing a long tone. Folkofonen has been presented at a number of occasions, such as the royal opening of the Trondheim Kammermusikkfestival 2007, the opening of Kulturminneåret 2009, NordWind-festivalen 2009 in Berlin, and interacting with Bergen Filharmoniske Orkester.

Kunst av næring is another of project of Hamre's. This is a joint concept between art life and business, where the idea is to create art of sound and images of specific industries. Within this concept, Hamre produced numerous audiovisual performances and films on behalf of the business community, among others Norsk Hydro, Statoil and "BIR".

Honors
Vossajazzprisen, 1993
Statens arbeidsstipend for composers, 2006
Hordaland fylkes kulturarbeiderpris in 2008
Bergen kommunes kunstnerpris in 2008

Discography 

With Rust
1983: Rust (EMI)

With Son Mu (Knut Kristiansen)
1985: Son Mu (Hot Club)

With Claudio Latini & Cristina Latini
1990: Cor De Dendë (Bums)

With the Talisman Group
1991: Dating (Odin)
1995: Vardøger (Odin)

With Henry Kaiser & David Lindley
1994: The Sweet Sunny North (Shanachie)
1996: The Sweet Sunny North Vol. 2  (Shanachie)

With Fliflet/Hamre Energiforsyning
1994: Ivar Aasen Goes Bulgaria (Lahrmsteiner Elite)

References

External links

Fliflet/Hamre Official website
Fargespill Official website

20th-century Norwegian drummers
21st-century Norwegian drummers
Norwegian jazz drummers
Male drummers
Norwegian composers
Norwegian male composers
1959 births
Living people
Musicians from Bergen
Hot Club Records artists
20th-century drummers
20th-century Norwegian male musicians
21st-century Norwegian male musicians
Male jazz musicians